Patella Island is a small but prominent island, more than 75 m high, lying  northwest of Ambush Bay off the north coast of Joinville Island. Patella Island was first surveyed by the Falkland Islands Dependencies Survey (FIDS) in 1953. The name is descriptive of the island's shape; Patella is the Latin name for a limpet.

See also 
 List of Antarctic and sub-Antarctic islands

Islands of the Joinville Island group